Amberg station is a railway station in the town of Amberg, located in Upper Palatinate, Germany.

References

Railway stations in Bavaria
Buildings and structures in Amberg